Jorge Sanguinetti (November 14, 1934 – January 5, 2017) was a Uruguayan political figure.

Background

For many years, he was associated with local political affairs in Colonia Department. He is a member of the Colorado Party (Uruguay), and during the 1970s was a leading party activist.

Minister of Transport and Public Works

In 1985, Jorge Sanguinetti's cousin, Julio María Sanguinetti took office as President of Uruguay, and the latter appointed the former to the post of Minister of Transport and Public Works. Jorge Sanguinetti served in that post until 1989.

Later career

President of ANCAP
Sanguinetti later served as President of the Uruguayan petroleum company ANCAP. He was noted for his support for that company's privatization.

Support for Pedro Bordaberry Herrán from 2007

In 2007, Sanguinetti became a supporter of Pedro Bordaberry Herrán's Vamos Uruguay grouping within the Colorado Party (Uruguay). In doing so, he joined a number of other prominent 'Colorados'.

References
 http://www.larepublica.com.uy/politica/270415-jorge-sanguinetti-se-suma-al-sector-de-pedro-bordaberry-vamos-uruguay

See also

 Politics of Uruguay
 Pedro Bordaberry#2009 Uruguayan Presidential elections
 List of political families#Uruguay

1934 births
2017 deaths
Ministers of Transport and Public Works of Uruguay
Uruguayan vice-presidential candidates
Colorado Party (Uruguay) politicians
Burials at the Central Cemetery of Montevideo